Zhurba is a surname. Notable people with the surname include:

Serhiy Zhurba (born 1987), Ukrainian futsal player
Viktor Zhurba (born 1950), Russian discus thrower